Harold Paul Charlton (born 6 December 1941) is an English former professional rugby league footballer who played in the 1960s, 1970s and 1980s, and coached in the 1970s, 1980s and 1990s. He was part of the Great Britain squad which won the 1972 World Cup.

Background
Paul Charlton was born in Whitehaven, Cumberland, and as of 2017 he is living in the Gold Coast, Queensland, Australia, and now plays touch football.

Playing career

International honours
Charlton won a cap for England while at Salford in the 1975 Rugby League World Cup against France, and won caps for Great Britain while at Workington in 1965 against New Zealand, while at Salford in the 1970 Rugby League World Cup against New Zealand (sub), in 1972 against France (2 matches), in the 1972 Rugby League World Cup against Australia, France, New Zealand, and Australia, in 1973 against Australia (3 matches), and in 1974 against France (2 matches), Australia (3 matches) and New Zealand (3 matches), during the 1974 Great Britain Lions tour of Australia and New Zealand he also played 11 non-Test matches scoring 8-tries and 12-goals for 48-points.

County Cup Final appearances
Paul Charlton played , and scored a try in Salford's 25-11 victory over Swinton in the 1972–73 Lancashire County Cup Final during the 1972–73 season at Wilderspool Stadium, Warrington on Saturday 21 October 1972, played  in the 9-19 defeat by Wigan in the 1973–74 Lancashire County Cup Final during the 1973–74 season at Wilderspool Stadium, Warrington on Saturday 13 October 1973, played  in the 2-6 defeat by Widnes in the 1974–75 Lancashire County Cup Final during the 1974–75 season at Central Park, Wigan on Saturday 2 November 1974, played  in Workington Town's 11-16 defeat by Widnes in the 1976–77 Lancashire County Cup Final during the 1976–77 season at Central Park, Wigan on Saturday 30 October 1976, played  in the 16-13 victory over Wigan in the 1977–78 Lancashire County Cup Final during the 1977–78 season at Wilderspool Stadium, Warrington on Saturday 29 October 1977, played  in the 13-15 defeat by Widnes in the 1978–79 Lancashire County Cup Final during the 1978–79 season at Central Park, Wigan on Saturday 7 October 1978, and played  in the 0-11 defeat by Widnes in the 1979–80 Lancashire County Cup Final during the 1979–80 season at the Willows, Weaste, Salford, on Saturday 8 December 1979.

BBC2 Floodlit Trophy Final appearances
Paul Charlton played  in Salford's 0-0 draw with Warrington in the 1974 BBC2 Floodlit Trophy Final during the 1974–75 season at The Willows, Salford on Tuesday 17 December 1974, and he did not play (Frank Stead played ) in the 10-5 victory over Warrington in the 1974 BBC2 Floodlit Trophy Final replay during the 1974–75 season at Wilderspool Stadium, Warrington on Tuesday 28 January 1975.

Player's No.6 Trophy Final appearances
Paul Charlton played  in Salford's 7-12 defeat by Leeds in the 1972–73 Player's No.6 Trophy Final during the 1972–73 season at Fartown, Huddersfield on Saturday 24 March 1973.

Career at Workington Town
In his two spells at Workington Town, Charlton made 415 appearances (Workington Town's "Appearances in a Career" record), scoring 111 tries, and kicking 77 goals, 65 of which came in two seasons, he scored 28 goals in the 1965–66 season, and 37 goals in the 1968–69 season, with Syd Lowdon and Jappie Ferreira being the primary goal-kickers in the early 1960s, followed by Ike Southward in the mid to late 1960s, during Charlton's second spell at Workington Town, the primary goal-kicker was Iain MacCorquodale (who scored 775 goals from 1972 to 1980, including over 100 goals in 4 consecutive seasons).

Personal life
Charlton married Lily (née Wilson) in 1965 in Whitehaven. They had two children: rugby league footballer who played in the 1980s, 1990s and 2000s, and coached in the 2000s and 2010s, Gary Paul Charlton (born 1967, Whitehaven), and Melanie Jayne Charlton (born 1971, Whitehaven).

References

External links
(archived by web.archive.org) » Legends Evening 60's
When Great Britain won the World Cup
Tracking down the heroes of 1972
Photograph 'Bill Ramsey forces his way over - Northern prop forward Bill Ramsey forces his way over Salford's try line after playing the ball forward. - Date: 25/04/1974' at rlhp.co.uk
 'Ken Kelly makes a break - Ken Kelly makes one of his fine breaks in the Club championship game. - Date: 25/04/1974' at rlhp.co.uk

1941 births
Living people
Barrow Raiders coaches
Blackpool Borough players
Cumberland rugby league team players
Cumbria rugby league team players
England national rugby league team players
English rugby league coaches
English rugby league players
Great Britain national rugby league team players
Rugby league players from Whitehaven
Rugby league fullbacks
Salford Red Devils players
Workington Town coaches
Workington Town players